Okpe is a kingdom in Delta State, Nigeria. Today, it is also the name of a local government area. It is one of the many kingdoms that make up Urhobo tribe. Its capital is Orerokpe. The kingdom plays host to the Osubi Airport (also known as Warri Airstrip), which is actually located at Osubi and the Delta State Trade Fair Complex. The Orodje celebrated ten years on ancestral throne. Geoffrey Arich is the king of Okpe Kingdom, Kenyan Branch. The kingship is usually rotated between the four ruling houses.

History
The Okpe kingdom was established as early as the 17th century. It has a traditional ruler with the title Orodje of Okpe. The Okpe people are known to have migrated to found the present day Sapele and the Orodje of Okpe still exercises authority over the land of Sapele.

The first king produced by this system was H.R.M. Esezi I, Orodje of Okpe whose sovereignty was around the period of 1770-1779.

H.R.M. Esezi II, became the second Orodje of Okpe.  As a pioneer advocate of democracy in the land of okpe, he also was pivotal to Nigeria.  He was  among the delegated kings that attended the 1957 Lyttelton Conference held in London in order to seek the Nigerian independence from the indirect government of the colonial master. He ruled the kingdom around the period of 1945-1966.

H.R.M Orhoro I, the third Orodje of Okpe ruled the kingdom from around the period of 1972-2004. He was educated at a catholic school and also served in the Nigeria police force. He later earned a Business Administration Diploma in the United Kingdom.
His early life experience served him well as a springboard for establishing and becoming a director of a company, the New Africa Industries Limited.

H.R.M Orhue I Orodje of Okpe, is the fourth and current king of Okpe.  He served as a high-ranking major general in the Nigerian Army. He was officially crowned on 29 July 2006.

Notable people
 
 
Gen.Patrick Aziza
 David Dafinone
 Joseph Karakitie Azigbo
 Harris Eghagha

References

 Joseph O. Asagba: The Untold Story of A Nigerian Royal Family (The Urhobo Ruling Clan of Okpe Kingdom), iUniverce, Inc, 2005

Delta State
History of Nigeria
Nigerian traditional states